Abdulai Yakubu is a Ghanaian politician and member of the first parliament of the second republic of Ghana representing Savalugu constituency in the Northern Region of Ghana under the membership of the National Alliance Liberals (NAL)

Early life and education 
Abdulai was born on 6 May 1929 and lived in Yendi a town in Tamale in the Northern Region of Ghana. He attended Tamale Middle Boarding School, where he obtained a Middle School Leaving Certificate and later served as a Traditional ruler and a Farmer before going into Parliament.

Politics 
He began his political career in 1969 when he became the parliamentary candidate for the NAL to represent his constituency in the Northern Region of Ghana prior to the commencement of the 1969 Ghanaian parliamentary election.

He was sworn into the First Parliament of the Second Republic of Ghana on 1 October 1969, after being pronounced winner at the 1969 Ghanaian election held on 26 August 1969. His tenure of office as a  member of parliament ended on 13 January 1972.

Personal life 
Yakubu is a Muslim.

References 

Possibly living people
1929 births
Ghanaian MPs 1969–1972
National Alliance of Liberals politicians
Ghanaian Muslims
Ghanaian farmers